Vixen Media Group, commonly referred to as Vixen, is an Internet pornography production company located in Los Angeles, California.

Company
Vixen Media Group was founded in 2014 by French entrepreneur and director Greg Lansky, CEO of GL Web Media and Strike 3 Holding along with partners Steve Matthyssen and Mike Miller. Lansky says he created the company to create higher-quality video that would be considered more 'artistic' than the normal realm of adult video content.

Vixen Media Group owns and operates seven online adult film sites: Vixen, Tushy, Blacked, Blacked Raw, Tushy Raw, Deeper, and Slayed. Slayed was launched in August 2021, and is the first all-girl brand, and was created as part of a mission to revolutionize female sex portrayals while attracting an audience of all genders and sexualities.

Greg Lansky sold his stake in Vixen Studios in January 2020.

Legal action 
In 2017, Strike 3 Holdings, owner of Vixen Studios, filed a federal copyright infringement lawsuit in the Southern District of New York against individuals who downloaded and distributed the copyrighted movies and placed them on file-sharing networks.

Awards 

Vixen has won several major awards in the adult-film industry, including:

2018 AVN Award – Best Ingénue Movie
2018 AVN Award – Best Marketing Campaign
2018 AVN Award – Best New Series
2018 AVN Award – Best Three-Way Sex Scene – Girl/Girl/Boy
2017 AVN Award – Best Boy/Girl Sex Scene
2017 AVN Award – Best New Studio 
2017 AVN Award – Best Anthology Movie
2017 AVN Award – Best Director – Non-Feature
2017 AVN Award – Best Marketing Campaign – Company Image
2017  AVN Award – Best New Imprint
2022 XBIZ Award — Studio of the Year
2022 XBIZ Europa Award – Global Studio Brand of the Year

References 

American pornographic film studios
American erotica and pornography websites
Film production companies of the United States
MILF pornography